Thomas Tucker Whittlesey (December 8, 1798 – August 20, 1868) was an American lawyer and politician who served as a U.S. Representative from Connecticut from 1836 to 1839.

Biography 
Thomas Tucker Whittlesey was born on December 8, 1798, in Danbury, Connecticut, Whittlesey attended the public schools and graduated from Yale College in 1817. He then attended Litchfield Law School, was admitted to the bar in 1818.

Career
Whittlesey started a law practice in Danbury, Connecticut. Whittlesey served as a probate judge.

Congress
Whittlesey was elected as a Jacksonian to the Twenty-fourth Congress to fill the vacancy caused by the death of Zalmon Wildman. He was reelected as a Democrat to the Twenty-fifth Congress and served from April 29, 1836, to March 3, 1839. He was an unsuccessful candidate for reelection in 1838 to the Twenty-sixth Congress.

Later career
He moved to Pheasant Branch, near Madison, Wisconsin, in 1846. He resumed practicing law and was also engaged in farming. He served as member of the Wisconsin Senate in 1853 and 1854.

Personal life
Whittlesey married Caroline Holley (1800–1841). He was cousin of Elisha Whittlesey and Frederick Whittlesey.

Whittlesey died on August 20, 1868, in Pheasant Branch, Wisconsin. He was interred in Forest Hill Cemetery in Madison, Wisconsin.

References

Further reading

Thomas Whittlesey, Litchfield Historical Society

External links

1798 births
1868 deaths
Connecticut state court judges
Yale College alumni
Litchfield Law School alumni
Politicians from Danbury, Connecticut
Politicians from Madison, Wisconsin
Democratic Party Wisconsin state senators
Jacksonian members of the United States House of Representatives from Connecticut
19th-century American politicians
Democratic Party members of the United States House of Representatives from Connecticut